Elachista ischnella is a moth of the family Elachistidae that is found in Arizona, Colorado, New Mexico and Texas.

The first 1/3 of the costa on the forewings is grey. The ground colour is white, densely dusted with brownish grey tips of scales. This dusting is weaker in the middle of the wing where there is an indistinct elongate dark grey streak at the fold. The hindwings are grey and the underside of the wings is also grey.

Etymology
The species name is derived from Greek ischnos (meaning dry, withered).

References

Moths described in 1997
ischnella
Endemic fauna of the United States
Moths of North America